Kagor may refer to: 

Kagor (wine)
Kagor, Tibet